Sanhedria Cemetery is a 27-dunam (6.67-acre) Jewish burial ground in the Sanhedria neighborhood of Jerusalem, adjacent to the intersection of Levi Eshkol Boulevard, Shmuel HaNavi Street, and Bar-Ilan Street. Unlike the Mount of Olives and Har HaMenuchot cemeteries that are located on the outer edges of the city, Sanhedria Cemetery is situated in the heart of western Jerusalem, in  proximity to residential housing. It is operated under the jurisdiction of the Kehilat Yerushalayim chevra kadisha (burial society) and accepts Jews from all religious communities. As of the 2000s, the cemetery is nearly filled to capacity.

History
Until 1948, Jewish burials in Jerusalem were conducted in the centuries-old Jewish cemetery on the Mount of Olives. In January 1948, the Arab siege of Jerusalem made the Mount of Olives inaccessible, as the route to the cemetery passed through hostile Arab villages. The catalyst for the opening of Sanhedria Cemetery was the March 23, 1948 explosion of three British army trucks filled with kerosene on Ben Yehuda Street in downtown Jerusalem. The explosion collapsed the Atlantic Hotel and heavily damaged adjacent buildings. Forty-two Jewish men, women, and children were killed in the blast, but there was nowhere to bury them. While the bodies lay in the courtyard of the Bikur Holim Hospital for five days, representatives of the Kehilat Yerushalayim chevra kadisha scoured the city for a suitable location for a new cemetery. An empty lot next to the Sanhedria neighborhood, in the vicinity of a government agricultural experiments station, was deemed appropriate, and permission was obtained from British Mandate authorities. The site was hastily consecrated by Ashkenazi Chief Rabbi Yitzhak HaLevi Herzog and Sephardi Chief Rabbi Ben-Zion Hai Uziel, and the bodies were buried on the fifth day in the presence of thousands.

In April 1948, 47 victims of the Hadassah medical convoy massacre, burned beyond recognition, were buried in a mass grave in the Sanhedria Cemetery. In the 1970s the son of one of the victims discovered that only 25 victims had actually been buried here and 22 had been declared missing.

With the outbreak of war in May 1948, Sanhedria Cemetery was located close to the front line on the northern border; for a while it was completely exposed to enemy fire. Burials resumed after the first cease fire on June 11, 1948, but four weeks later, the pallbearers at a funeral were targeted by Arab sniper fire and one died, causing a cessation of burials once again. Two small burial grounds in central Jerusalem – Sheikh Badr Cemetery in the Sheikh Badr neighborhood, and Shaare Zedek Cemetery behind the first Shaare Zedek Hospital – were then opened and used until the end of the war.

Following the 1949 Armistice Agreement, with the Mount of Olives remaining under Jordanian control, Sanhedria Cemetery became a regular burial ground. With the opening of the new neighborhoods of Shmuel HaNavi, Maalot Dafna, and Ramat Eshkol, the cemetery was encircled by residential housing.

After the establishment of the State of Israel, it emerged that the cemetery was not registered with the government land-ownership office and was in violation of certain building codes. As a result of procedural violations, the cemetery was tied up in litigation for many years.

Operation

Sanhedria Cemetery is operated under the exclusive jurisdiction of the Kehilat Yerushalayim chevra kadisha. This burial society was founded in 1939 by Zionist leaders and moderate rabbis of the Old Yishuv, leading many Haredi residents of the Old Yishuv to shun the Sanhedria Cemetery.

Graves are topped by a horizontal, rectangular limestone gravestone engraved with the name, date, and accolades of the deceased. The gravestones of Eleazar Sukenik, a noted Israeli archeologist who researched the nearby Tombs of the Sanhedrin, and his wife Chassia, are uniquely decorated with carvings and motifs of the Second Temple era.

The cost of burial at Sanhedria Cemetery is not subsidized by the state, as in other cemeteries. In September 2008 the price of a double plot stood at 75,000 shekels (approximately US$21,000).

At the southern end of the cemetery stands the Sanhedria Funeral Parlor, which also conducts funeral services for burials in other cemeteries. In 1992, former Prime Minister Menachem Begin eschewed a state funeral in favor of eulogies at the Sanhedria Funeral Parlor and burial at the Mount of Olives. The side of the funeral parlor overlooking the busy commercial intersection of Shmuel HaNavi and Bar-Ilan Streets displays large metal letters that read: בית מועד לכל חי ("Meeting Place for All the Living").

A sign posted on the outer wall of the cemetery, facing Levi Eshkol Boulevard, warns Kohanim not to pass under the trees overhanging the wall in order to avoid tumat ohel.

Notable burials

Rabbis
 Ben Zion Abba Shaul (1924–1998), rosh yeshiva of Porat Yosef Yeshiva, Jerusalem – follow the left path, go up the stairs on the left, between the steps from the second level to the third.
 Shmuel Berenbaum (1920–2008), rosh yeshiva of the Mir yeshiva, Brooklyn, NY 
 Yaakov Moshe Charlap (1882–1951), rabbi of Sha'arei Hesed neighborhood of Jerusalem and rosh yeshiva of Mercaz HaRav Kook – a few rows to the right of the path in the central area by the entrance.
 Yitzhak HaLevi Herzog (1888–1959), Ashkenazi Chief Rabbi of Israel
 Yisrael Elazar Hopstein (1898–1966), Kohnitzer Rebbe
 Sadqa Hussein (1876–1961), rabbi of Shemesh Sedaqah Synagogue, Jerusalem
 Avraham Kalmanowitz (1891–1964), rosh yeshiva of the Mir yeshiva, Brooklyn, NY
 Shraga Moshe Kalmanowitz (1918–1998), rosh yeshiva of the Mir yeshiva, Brooklyn, NY
 Aryeh Levin (1885–1969), Jerusalem tzadik and "Rav of the Prisoners" – in the Charlap row
 Shimshon Aharon Polanski (1876–1948), Rav of Teplik, Ukraine
 Avraham Elimelech Shapira (d. 1966), Grodzhisker Rebbe
 David Feuerwerker (1912–1980), Chief Rabbi of Lyon (France), Rabbi in Neuilly-sur-Seine and Paris, Dayan in the Vaad Hair of Montreal, Canada
 Nissan Aharon Tikochinsky (1922–2012), director, Etz Chaim Yeshiva
 Yechiel Michel Tucazinsky (1872–1955), Talmudist and educator
 Duvid Twersky (1872–1950), Rachmastrivka Rebbe of Jerusalem
 Yehuda Tzadka (1910–1991), rosh yeshiva of Porat Yosef Yeshiva, Jerusalem – about halfway in on the right side by the fence with a tall sign next to the grave.
 David Alexander Winter (1878–1953), Rabbi in Lübeck
 Shaul Yisraeli (1909–1995), rosh yeshiva of Mercaz HaRav Kook
 Ovadia Yosef (1920–2013), Former Sephardi Chief Rabbi of Israel – All the way to the far right upon entering.

Israeli academics and government figures
 Yehuda Amichai (1924–2000),  Israeli poet
 Umberto Cassuto, (1883–1951), Italian Jewish Biblical scholar
 Gad Frumkin (1887–1960), Israel High Court judge
 Simcha Holtzberg (1924–1994), Israeli activist
 David Horowitz (1899–1979), first governor of the Bank of Israel
 Esther Raziel-Naor (1911–2002), Israeli politician
 Cecil Roth, British Jewish historian (1899–1970)
 Gershom Scholem (1897–1982), German-born  philosopher and historian
 Reuven Shiloah (1909–1959), director of the Mossad
 Eleazar Sukenik (1889–1953), Israeli archeologist
 Shmuel Tamir (1923–1987), Israeli Minister of Justice
 Saul Lieberman (1902–1983) | Professor of Talmud in the Jewish Theological Seminary]]

References

External links

 "Family suspected of moving ultra-Orthodox rabbi's body to more 'religious' cemetery" Haaretz, 7 August 2012
 

Jewish cemeteries in Jerusalem
1948 establishments in Israel
Cemeteries established in the 1940s